Muldoon's, sometimes called Muldoon's Off 10, was a music venue and nightclub located in Mounds View, Minnesota. It was particularly popular in the mid-1980s hosting bands such as UFO, Uriah Heep, Victory and Blue Öyster Cult.

References

Music venues in Minnesota